The Secretary of Technology is a former member of the Virginia Governor's Cabinet. The office was last held by Karen Jackson. The Secretary oversees the Virginia Information Technologies Agency and Virginia Center for Innovative Technology. It was absorbed into the Secretariat of Commerce and Trade in 2018 under Governor Ralph Northam.

List of Secretaries of Technology
 Donald Upson (1998–2002)
 George Newstrom (2002–2004)
 Eugene Huang (2004–2006)
 Aneesh Chopra (2006–2009)
 Leonard Pomata (2009–2010)
 Jim Duffey (2010–2014)
 Karen Jackson (2014–2018)

References

Government agencies established in 1998
1998 establishments in Virginia
Technology
Technology